Krma is an alpine valley in the Julian Alps in the Upper Carniola region of northwestern Slovenia. The entire valley lies in Triglav National Park.

Name
The name Krma is of uncertain origin, possibly derived from a substrate root such as *karma or *garma, which may be preserved in Istrian Romance karma 'rock crevice'; it is less likely to be related to Albanian karmë 'rocky hill'. It cannot be excluded that the name may also be connected with the Slovene common noun krma 'fodder' because of historical pasturing activity in the valley.

Geography
Krma is the longest and easternmost of the glacial valleys near Mojstrana. It is the starting point for many routes through Triglav National Park. The lower northern end of the Krma Valley intersects with the upper western end of the Radovna Valley.

Approximately two-thirds of the way up the valley is the Kovinar alpine lodge with 15 berths, a popular stopping point for hikers. This lodge was originally adapted from a shepherd's hut and opened in 1948. In 1959, a new larger lodge was built by workers from the Jesenice ironworks. It was renovated in 1983. It is open from the beginning of June until the end of September.  

The following peaks surround Krma: toward the southeast Debela peč, Lipanski vrh, Debeli vrh, Mali Draški vrh, Veliki Draški vrh, and Tosc; and toward the west Macesnovec, Luknja peč, and Rjavina.

References

External links 

Valleys in Upper Carniola
Valleys of the Julian Alps
Municipality of Kranjska Gora
Triglav National Park